KC Adams (born March 28, 1971) is a Cree, Ojibway, and British artist and educator based in Winnipeg, Manitoba.

She is a multimedia artist who works in sculpture, installation, drawing, painting, photography, ceramics, printmaking and kinetic art. She is well known for creating artwork that draws inspiration from popular culture and science fiction to deal with contemporary social issues. Her work addresses racism, colonization, human impact on land and the challenges and perceptions of Indigenous people. Adams considers herself a social-practice artist through the way her practice uses audience-interaction to bring attention to socio-political issues.

KC Adams is a full-time practicing artist specializing in many mediums such as digital photography, clay, sculpture, painting, video, installation, public art, performance, beading, birch bark biting, leather work and quill work. She has created many one-of-a-kind artworks that will never be duplicated. In her work, she reflects on the relationships between ancestral knowledge, memory, and the sacredness of water. Using a variety of media, including copper, clay and "birch bark technology", the work is a visual reminder of the knowledge bundles (traditional teachings) that are passed onto the next generation of life givers and water protectors.

Artwork

Besides working with more traditional forms of art, Adams has an interest in computers and new media technologies.

Adams' first public art commission, entitled Community, hangs above the lobby of the United Way building in Winnipeg. The works consists of a large, web-like ceramic and clay structure and was unveiled in 2014. In 2018, Adams collaborated with artists Val Vint and Jamie Isaac on a Niimaamaa, a 30' public art sculpture at The Forks. Adams' upcoming public sculpture Friendship will be installed near the Canadian Museum For Human Rights in 2021. 

Work from her Cyborg Hybrid series shows Euro-Aboriginal artists following the doctrine of the Cyborg Manifesto.

Her exhibition Perception is a pointed political statement aimed at challenging deeply engrained stigmas and prejudices against First Nations peoples. The exhibition, shown in various galleries, bus shelters, and billboards in Winnipeg, featured two side-by-side portraits of members of the city's indigenous community. The portrait on the left showed the subject captioned with a racial slur, while the portrait on the right showed the same subject with their real name, occupation, interests and passions. In 2019, Perception was turned into a hardcover published by Portage & Main press and was chosen for the Canadian Children’s Book Centre's Best Books for Children and Teens list.

Her artwork has been exhibited at the McMichael Canadian Art Collection, the Museum of Contemporary Canadian Art in Toronto, PHOTOQUAI: Biennale des images du monde in Paris, France, Carleton University Art Gallery, Winnipeg Art Gallery, Art Gallery of Southwestern Manitoba, OBORO Gallery,  Urban Shaman Contemporary Aboriginal Art Gallery, Gallery One One One and FitzGerald Study Centre at the University of Winnipeg.

Career
Adams obtained her BFA from Concordia University in 1998. She served as Director at the Urban Shaman Gallery in Winnipeg, has worked at Plug In Institute of Contemporary Art and has served as president of the board of directors of Ace Art and on the arts advisory panel for the Manitoba Arts Council. Adams is an art educator; working with inner-city schools to teach art through Royal Conservatory of Music’s Learning Through the Arts and Manitoba Artists In The Schools. Adams was the set designer for the Royal Winnipeg Ballet's Going Home Star: Truth and Reconciliation in 2014. Adams participated in residencies at the Banff Centre, the Confederation Art Centre in Charlottetown, the National Museum of the American Indian and the Parramatta Arts Gallery in Australia.

Collections
Adams' work is in public and private permanent collections nationally and internationally. Work from Cyborg Hybrid and Perception are in the permanent collection of the National Gallery of Canada in Ottawa. Ten prints from her Circuit City series are in the Indian and Inuit Art Centre in Ottawa, Ontario. Birch Bark Ltd. is in the collection of the Canadian consulate of Sydney, Australia and the Dunlop Art Gallery. Cyborg Hybrid KC, Cyborg Hybrid Niki, Power Peyote Stitch, and iPad is Cree Floral, are in the collection of the MacKenzie Art Gallery.

Books 
KC is an author with her book Perception: A Photo Series that Quill & Quire. chose as 2019 Books of the Year.

Awards 
KC Adams has received numerous grants and awards from the Winnipeg Arts Council, Manitoba Arts Council, and Canada Council for the Arts.  In 2015, she won the Winnipeg Arts Council Making A Mark Award. In 2017, she received the Aboriginal Circle of Educators Trailblazer Award and the Senate 150 Medal presented by Senator Patricia Bovey.

References

1971 births
Living people
Artists from Saskatchewan
First Nations artists
Concordia University alumni
Canadian multimedia artists
Canadian women artists
Canadian arts administrators
Women arts administrators
People from Yorkton
First Nations women artists